St Patrick's GFC is a Gaelic football club based in the village of Donagh, County Fermanagh, Northern Ireland.

History
The club was founded in October 1971, with the ladies' football club founded in 1993. The club reached the final of the Fermanagh Senior Football Championship for the first time in 1976, losing to Enniskillen Gaels. The club lost further finals in 1982 and 1984 to Roslea Shamrocks, and in 2002 and 2003 to Enniskillen Gaels. St Pat's finally claimed their first county title in 2008, beating Derrygonnelly Harps in the final. Donagh reached the final again in 2010 but lost to Roslea. The club's most recent championship success came in 2021, at the junior grade.

Honours
 Fermanagh Senior Football Championship (1): 2008
 Fermanagh Intermediate Football Championship (2): 1992, 1999
 Fermanagh Junior Football Championship (4): 1978, 1979, 1990, 2021

References

External links
 St Patrick's GFC Official Website

Gaelic football clubs in County Fermanagh
Gaelic games clubs in County Fermanagh